Roy Walsh is a former Provisional IRA volunteer. He was convicted for his part in the IRA's 1973 Old Bailey bombing which injured over 200 people and one person died from a heart attack due to the bombing.

IRA activity
Walsh joined the IRA in the wake of the August 1969 riots in Belfast in which Bombay Street a Catholic/Nationalist area was burned to the ground by a Loyalist sectarian mob, 1,820 families (mostly Catholics) had to be evacuated and the British Army sent in to keep the peace.

Walsh joined the Provisional IRA's Belfast Brigade, which in 1973 was allegedly Commanded by Gerry Adams at the time and Adams picked the 11-person Active service unit to carry out the 1973 London bombings,Walsh, along with  Volunteers Gerry Kelly, Hugh Feeney, sisters Dolours Price & Marian Price along with six other Volunteers from the Belfast Brigade made up the rest of the ASU tasked with the London bombings.

Initially six targets in London had been planned to bomb but this was scaled down to four targets, one of which had been picked to bomb was the Old Bailey courthouse - this was the target Roy Walsh was selected to bomb. On the 8 March 1973 at about 06:00 am Roy Walsh & Gerry Kelly primed their car bomb which weighed about 100 lb and drove to the Old Bailey , three other bombs were planted by other IRA volunteers around London and all timed to go off at roughly the same time.

Before the bomb went off Walsh along with nine other members of his team were caught trying to leave the country at Heathrow Airport and detained there and then. The bomb at the Old Bailey exploded at 14:49 pm and injured between 180 - 200 people, one person died of a heart attack attributed to the bomb.

At his trial on 14 November 1973 Roy Walsh received life imprisonment for the bombings and 20 years for conspiracy along with seven other IRA volunteers.

Walsh along with several other IRA prisoners and dozens of inmates was involved in the Albany Prison Riot of May 1983. Several prisoners, prison officers and one warder received minor injuries during the riot.

Release
Walsh was released in 1994 after serving nearly 21 years in English prisons, making him one of the longest serving IRA prisoners in an English jail. Only the members of the Provisional IRA's Balcombe Street Gang served longer sentences.

When interviewed by journalist Peter Taylor, Walsh said about the bombing:

"I was shocked that there was so many casualties because our intention was never, never to injure anyone...We believed our warnings were adequate. We thought an hour was plenty of time. We gave the description of the cars, their registration numbers and where they were parked. I think it was the slowness of the police reactions that caused the injuries."

When asked if he had any regret he said:

"No. The only regret I've got is getting caught, and I would say every Republican prisoner regrets getting caught. For actually doing what I did, no, I've no regrets.

References

Sources
Peter Taylor - Behind The Mask: The IRA and Sinn Fein
Ruan O'Donnell -Special Category: The IRA IN English Prisons Vol.2: 1978-1985
CAIN project 

1949 births
Prisoners from Northern Ireland sentenced to life imprisonment
Living people
Paramilitaries from Belfast
Prisoners sentenced to life imprisonment by England and Wales
Provisional Irish Republican Army members
Republicans imprisoned during the Northern Ireland conflict